Henty Highway is a rural highway in western Victoria, Australia. It is primarily a north-south route, consisting of a mix of dual-lane, single-carriageway country highway and four-lane arterial road within some of the larger towns along the route. It was named in honour of Edward Henty, a British colonist regarded as the first permanent European settler of the Port Phillip District (in what later became the Colony of Victoria), in the town eventually named Portland.

History
The passing of the Highways and Vehicles Act of 1924 through the Parliament of Victoria provided for the declaration of State Highways, roads two-thirds financed by the State government through the Country Roads Board (later VicRoads). The Henty Highway was declared a State Highway in August 1938, cobbled together from roads between Mildura, Warracknabeal, Horsham, and Hamilton to Portland (for a total of 263 miles); before this declaration, these roads were referred to as Mildura Road, Hopetoun(-Lascelles) Road, Hopetoun-Warracknabeal Road, Hamilton-Horsham Road and Hamilton-Portland Road. It originally started from the Calder Highway in Nunga, the junction south of Ouyen; when the North-Western Highway was renamed Sunraysia Highway on 11 September 1972, and extended from Lascelles to Nunga, the Henty Highway was truncated back to Lascelles. The southern end of the highway through Portland was changed in January 1987: from New and Percy and Gawler Streets terminating at the intersection of Gawler, Cliff and Bentick Streets in central Portland, to its current alignment along Port Road and the southern section of Portland-Nelson Road to the intersection with Wellington Road in Portland's southern suburbs.

The Henty Highway was signed as State Route 107 between Portland and Lascelles in 1986; with Victoria's conversion to the newer alphanumeric system in the late 1990s, this was replaced by route A200 between Portland and Horsham, and B200 between Horsham and Lascelles.

The passing of the Road Management Act 2004 granted the responsibility of overall management and development of Victoria's major arterial roads to VicRoads: in 2013, VicRoads re-declared the road as Henty Highway (Arterial #6620) between the Sunraysia Highway in Lascelles and Madeira Packet Road at Portland.

Upgrades
1949 –  deviation of the Henty Highway as a result of proposed inundation following the construction of the Rocklands Reservoir dam on the Glenelg River, between Cavendish and Cherrypool.

Major intersections and towns

See also

 Highways in Australia
 Highways in Victoria

References

Highways in Victoria (Australia)
Transport in Barwon South West (region)